Lesley Brooks Wells (born October 6, 1937) is a former United States district judge of the United States District Court for the Northern District of Ohio.

Education

Wells earned a Bachelor of Arts degree from Chatham College (now Chatham University) in 1959 and a Juris Doctor from the Cleveland State University College of Law in 1974. She was employed as a federal court intern through the Women's Law Fund from 1973 to 1974.

Career

Wells maintained a private law practice for six years (1975–1978 and 1980–1983) in Cleveland, interrupted by two years (1979–1980) as director of the ABAR III Civil Rights Litigation Support Center at the Cleveland State University College of Law. She was adjunct professor at the Cleveland State University College of Law (1980–1981) and adjunct assistant professor, College of Urban Affairs, Cleveland State University (1980–1983 and 1990–1992).

Judicial service

After more than a decade as a Cuyahoga County Court of Common Pleas judge (1983–1994), President Bill Clinton nominated her on November 19, 1993, for a judgeship vacated by John Michael Manos. She was confirmed by the Senate on February 10, 1994, and received her commission the following day. Twelve years later, on February 14, 2006 she became a senior judge. She retired from active service on October 2, 2015.

Personal

Wells was married to the late Charles F. Clarke, a partner in the multinational law firm of Squire, Sanders & Dempsey. He died in January 2014.

References

External links

1937 births
Living people
Chatham University alumni
Cleveland–Marshall College of Law alumni
Cleveland State University faculty
Judges of the United States District Court for the Northern District of Ohio
Ohio state court judges
People from Muskegon, Michigan
United States district court judges appointed by Bill Clinton
20th-century American judges
20th-century American women judges
21st-century American women judges
21st-century American judges